The Heavenly Queen Temple is a temple dedicated to Mazu or Tian Shang Sheng Mu (天上聖母), Chinese Goddess of Sea and Patron Deity of fishermen, sailors and any occupations related to sea/ocean, also regarded as Ancestral Deity for Lim (林) Clan. The temple is located in the Melbourne suburb of Footscray and overlooks the Maribyrnong River. It is Australia's largest Taoist temple and includes a  statue of Mazu imported from Nanjing, China. The main hall opened to the public in 2015, but construction of the temple complex continued until 2020 with two additional halls completed.

See also
 A-Ma Temple, Macau
 Ma-Cho Temple, Philippines
 List of Mazu temples around the world
 Qianliyan & Shunfeng'er
 Tin Hau temples in Hong Kong

References

External links

Temples in Australia
Mazu temples
2015 establishments in Australia
Buildings and structures in Victoria (Australia)